St Jude's Church, Brighton is an Anglican church on Brighton Road, Brighton, South Australia.

History 
The land for the church was purchased from John Alexander Voules Brown. The foundation stone was laid on 16 December 1854 by Lady Fox Young with Archbishop Augustus Short conducting the service.

For the first ten years of its existence, St Jude's was served by the incumbent of St Mary's on the Sturt, who also had responsibility for Christ Church, O'Halloran Hill.

On 24 December 1948 the St Jude's Players had their beginning.

The church was seriously damaged in the 1954 Adelaide earthquake.

People
 Henry Dutton, pastoralist
 Garry Weatherill
 Hartley Williams, curate 1879–1881

St. Jude's Cemetery

People interred in the cemetery include: 
 James Ashton (1859–1935) artist
 Robert Bungey (1914–1943) fighter pilot of WWII
 Sir Reginald Roderic St Clair Chamberlain (1901–1990) judge
 Harold More Cooper (1886–1970) wireless operator, archaeologist and historian
 Sidney Crawford (1885–1968) businessman and philanthropist
 Alexander Crooks (1847–1943) bank manager, cricketer and embezzler
 Josiah Eustace Dodd (1856–1952) organbuilder
 Sir Herbert Sydney Hudd (1881–1948) politician
 Sir Douglas Mawson (1882–1958) geologist, Antarctic explorer and academic
 Sir John Newland (1864–1932) railwayman and politician
 Arthur James Perkins (1871–1944) agricultural scientist and viticulturist
 Sir William Herbert Phillipps (1847–1935) merchant and philanthropist
 Max Pontifex Australian rules footballer who played with West Torrens in the South Australian National Football League (SANFL)
 Rowland Rees (1840–1904) architect and politician
 Herbert Clarence Richards (1876–1949) businessman and motor-body manufacturer
 Tobias John Martin Richards (1850–1939) manufacturer
 Alfred Jabez Roberts OBE (1863–1939), stockbroker, mayor, and sportsman
 George Klewitz Soward (1857 – 1941), architect and politician
 Geoffrey Richard Shedley (1914–1981), architect and sculptor
 William Knox Simms (1830–1897) brewer, businessman and politician
 Richard Smith (1836–1919) merchant
 Catherine Eliza (Katie) Stow (1856–1940) collector of Aboriginal legends
 Tullie Cornthwaite Wollaston (1863–1931) opal dealer

References

External links
 
 

Judes, St
Judes, St
Judes, St
Cemeteries in South Australia
Anglican cemeteries in Australia
1854 establishments in Australia